Dawit Seyaum Biratu (born 27 July 1996) is an Ethiopian middle- and long-distance runner who specialises in the 1500 metres. She placed fourth at the 2015 World Championships and won the silver medal at the 2016 World Indoor Championships. Dawit took a bronze in the 5000 metres at the 2022 World Championships.

She was in her specialist event the 2013 World Youth Championship silver medallist, and 2014 World junior champion.

Career
Dawit Seyaum made her first impact at national level in 2013, winning the 1500 metres Ethiopian junior title. Her international debut on the IAAF Diamond League circuit followed shortly after, and she set a personal best of 4:14.95 minutes in the event at the Doha Diamond League meet. She was selected to compete in the 1500 m at the 2013 World Youth Championships in Athletics held in Donetsk, Ukraine and was runner-up to Tigist Gashaw – the first time Ethiopia took the top two spots in that event. She reversed this placing at the 2013 African Junior Championships, taking the title with a best of 4:09.00 minutes several seconds ahead of Tigist.

Dawit won her first indoor competition in Prague in February 2014, running 1500 m with a time of 4:09.08 minutes. At the Rabat Meeting, she established herself among the world's top 1500 m runners with a win in 3:59.53 minutes – an Ethiopian junior record and meeting record which ranked her seventh in the global rankings that year. She was near four minutes again at the New York Diamond League, where she finished as runner-up. Dawit entered the World Junior Championships in Eugene as favourite and delivered on this by winning the gold medal, going unchallenged throughout the final lap. Her first senior medal followed at the African Championships in Athletics, where she was the silver medallist behind the more experienced Hellen Obiri. Dawit was chosen for the Africa team for the 2014 IAAF Continental Cup and finished with the bronze medal behind Sifan Hassan and Shannon Rowbury.

In 2015, she secured in the 1500 m a gold at the African Junior Championships, placed fourth at the World Championships in Beijing (behind, 1–3, Genzebe Dibaba, Faith Kipyegon and Sifan Hassan), and won the event at the African Games held in Brazzaville.

The next year, Dawit took the World Indoor Championship silver in her specialist event in Portland, and finished eight in the final of the 2016 Rio Olympics.

The 2018 World Indoor Championships held in Birmingham were unsuccessful for her as she was eliminated in the heats.

In February 2022, Dawit set a world-leading time of 8:23.24 for the indoor 3000 metres at the Meeting Hauts-de-France Pas-de-Calais in Liévin, becoming the third-fastest woman in this indoor event in history (only her compatriots Dibaba and Gudaf Tsegay ran faster). She finished fifth at the event in 8:44.55 at the World Indoor Championships in Belgrade the following month.

At the 2022 World Championships in Eugene, Oregon in July, Dawit competed in the 5000 metres event and claimed the bronze medal in a time of 14:47.36 behind Tsegay (14:46.29) and Beatrice Chebet (14:46.75). She ended that year on high, winning for the second consecutive time the 5 kilometres road race at the BOclassic held in Bolzano, Italy (in 2021, she set a course record).

Achievements

International competitions

Personal bests
 1500 metres – 3:58.09 (Paris 2016)
 1500 metres indoor – 4:00.28 (Boston 2016)
 2000 metres – 5:32.40 (Zagreb 2021)
 2000 metres indoor – 5:35.46 (Boston 2015) World under-20 best
 3000 metres indoor – 8:23.24 (Liévin 2022)
 5000 metres – 14:25.84 (Oslo 2022)
Road
 5 kilometres – 14:39 (Lille 2021)
 10 kilometres – 31:25 (Geneva 2021)

Circuit wins
 Diamond League
 2015 (1500 m): Doha
 2017 (1500 m): Birmingham British Grand Prix
 2022 (5000 m): Birmingham, Oslo Bislett Games

References

External links

 

Living people
1996 births
Ethiopian female middle-distance runners
World Athletics Championships athletes for Ethiopia
Athletes (track and field) at the 2016 Summer Olympics
Olympic athletes of Ethiopia
African Games gold medalists for Ethiopia
African Games medalists in athletics (track and field)
Athletes (track and field) at the 2015 African Games
20th-century Ethiopian women
21st-century Ethiopian women